The Meeting Tree is a former Australian electronic music duo made up of Joyride (born Rowan Dix) and Raph Lauren. Their EP R U A Cop was nominated for a 2015 ARIA Award for Best Urban Album.

After releasing their final EP in 2016, the duo created The Meeting Tree Podcast. In 2021 the duo announced a premium subscription to their podcast, as well as an apparel collection featuring limited release items.

Band members
 Joyride 
 Raph Lauren aka Mr Sydney

Discography
R U A Cop EP (2015) - Sony AUS #53
Life is Long: Slow Down! EP (2015) - Sony
I Was Born A Baby And I'll Die A Baby EP (2016) - Sony

References

Australian hip hop groups
Australian musical duos
New South Wales musical groups